Hajji Nawab Kalb Ali Khan Bahadur (1832 – 23 March 1887) was a Nawab of the princely state of Rampur from 1865 to 1887. Succeeding his father, Sir Nawab Yusef Ali Khan Bahadur, he continued his father's good works, expanding the Rampur library, constructing the Jama Masjid costing Rs.3 lakhs and encouraging the spread of education, irrigation, architecture, literature and art in general. A gifted ruler, Sir Kalb Ali Khan was highly literate in Arabic and Persian and patronised scholars from across India and the Islamic world. He was a member of John Lawrence's governance council from 1878 to his death, attended the Delhi Durbar of Queen Victoria and was granted a personal salute of 17-guns. He was succeeded at his death in 1887, aged 55, by his son, Muhammad Mushtaq Ali Khan Bahadur.

Titles
1832-1865: Nawabzada Kalb Ali Khan, Wali Ahad Bahadur
1865-1872: His Highness 'Ali Jah, Farzand-i-Dilpazir, Mukhlis ud-Daula, Nasir ul-Mulk, Amir ul-Umara, Nawab Kalb Ali Khan Bahadur, Mustaid Jang, Nawab of Rampur
1872-1873: His Highness 'Ali Jah, Farzand-i-Dilpazir, Mukhlis ud-Daula, Nasir ul-Mulk, Amir ul-Umara, Hajji Nawab Kalb Ali Khan Bahadur, Mustaid Jang, Nawab of Rampur
1873-1875: His Highness 'Ali Jah, Farzand-i-Dilpazir-i-Daulat-i-Inglishia, Mukhlis ud-Daula, Nasir ul-Mulk, Amir ul-Umara, Hajji Nawab Kalb Ali Khan Bahadur, Mustaid Jang, Nawab of Rampur
1875-1877: His Highness 'Ali Jah, Farzand-i-Dilpazir-i-Daulat-i-Inglishia, Mukhlis ud-Daula, Nasir ul-Mulk, Amir ul-Umara, Hajji Nawab Sir Kalb Ali Khan Bahadur, Mustaid Jang, Nawab of Rampur, GCSI
1877-1878: His Highness 'Ali Jah, Farzand-i-Dilpazir-i-Daulat-i-Inglishia, Mukhlis ud-Daula, Nasir ul-Mulk, Amir ul-Umara, Hajji Nawab Sir Kalb Ali Khan Bahadur, Mustaid Jang, Nawab of Rampur, GCSI
1878-1887: His Highness 'Ali Jah, Farzand-i-Dilpazir-i-Daulat-i-Inglishia, Mukhlis ud-Daula, Nasir ul-Mulk, Amir ul-Umara, Hajji Nawab Sir Kalb Ali Khan Bahadur, Mustaid Jang, Nawab of Rampur, GCSI, CIE

Honours
Knight Grand Commander of the Order of the Star of India (GCSI)-1875
Prince of Wales's Gold Medal-1875
Empress of India Medal in Gold-1877
Companion of the Order of the Indian Empire (CIE)-1878

References

Kalb Ali Khan
Knights Grand Commander of the Order of the Star of India
Companions of the Order of the Indian Empire
1830s births
1887 deaths
Indian Sunni Muslims
Indian knights